Stewart Duncan (born 5 June 1940) is  a former Australian rules footballer who played with Fitzroy in the Victorian Football League (VFL).

Notes

External links 		
		
		

		
Living people		
1940 births		
Australian rules footballers from Victoria (Australia)		
Fitzroy Football Club players